Ferdinand Karl Viktor (20 July 1821 – 15 December 1849) was Archduke of Austria-Este and Prince of Modena.

Biography
Born in Modena, he was the second son of Francis IV of Modena and his niece-consort Maria Beatrice of Savoy. His paternal grandmother had been heiress to the Duchy of Modena, because her father Ercole III d'Este had no sons.

Ferdinand married Archduchess Elisabeth Franziska of Austria, daughter of Archduke Josef Anton of Austria and his third wife Duchess Maria Dorothea of Württemberg on 4 December 1846 in the Schönbrunn Palace in Vienna. Elisabeth and Ferdinand had one daughter:
Maria Theresa of Austria-Este (1849–1919), who became the last Queen of Bavaria. She also became the Jacobite claimant to the thrones of England, Scotland and Ireland upon the death of her uncle Francis V of Modena.

Ferdinand, who was a Feldmarschalleutnant (Austrian "two stars" general rank), died at Brno a few months later at the age of 28 from typhus. His widow remarried with Archduke Karl Ferdinand of Austria.

Ferdinand is the link in the Jacobite succession between his brother Francis V, Duke of Modena and his daughter Maria Theresa of Austria-Este.

Ancestry

Sources 

1821 births
1849 deaths
Deaths from typhus
Austria-Este
Modenese princes
Knights of the Golden Fleece of Austria
Austrian princes
Sons of monarchs